Hood Environment is the third studio album by rapper Drag-On, released on September 4, 2007 for T.R.U.S.T. Family. Hood Environment was Drag-On's only independent album to be released. Featured guests on the album included The Dude, Eyez B, G Luck, and Pit Looks.

Track listing

References

2007 albums
Drag-On albums